Soesilarishius is a spider genus of the jumping spider family, Salticidae.

The type species S. amrishi is only known from male specimens, which are 3.1 mm long, with a dark brown carapace.

Validity

The genus describer Dewanand Makhan publishes in the Australian journal Calodema, whose editor seems to have no quality standards whatsoever, while comparing scientists in general with Hitler and Stalin. While Makhan's work on ants and beetles is substandard (describing existing species without knowledge of the fundamental literature), Soesilarishius seems to have been accepted by the arachnologist community, with 23 species being accepted .

Name
The genus is named after the wife and a son of the describer, Soesila and Rishwan. The type species is named after another son, Amrish.

Species
, the World Spider Catalog accepted the following species:

Soesilarishius albipes Ruiz, 2011 – Brazil
Soesilarishius amrishi Makhan, 2007 (type species) – Suriname, Brazil
Soesilarishius aurifrons (Taczanowski, 1878) – Peru, French Guiana
Soesilarishius bicrescens Ruiz, 2013 – Brazil
Soesilarishius cearensis Ruiz, 2013 – Brazil
Soesilarishius chaplini Ruiz, 2013 – Brazil
Soesilarishius crispiventer Ruiz, 2011 – Brazil
Soesilarishius cymbialis Ruiz, 2011 – Brazil
Soesilarishius dromedarius Ruiz, 2011 – Brazil
Soesilarishius elongatulus Ruiz & Sobrinho, 2016 – Brazil
Soesilarishius excentricus Ruiz, 2013 – Brazil
Soesilarishius flagellator Ruiz, 2013 – Brazil
Soesilarishius laticlavus Ruiz & Sobrinho, 2016 – Brazil
Soesilarishius lunatus Ruiz, 2011 – Brazil
Soesilarishius macrochelis Ruiz, 2013 – Brazil
Soesilarishius micaceus Zhang & Maddison, 2012 – Ecuador
Soesilarishius minimus Ruiz, 2011 – Brazil
Soesilarishius muiratinga Ruiz, 2013 – Brazil
Soesilarishius paxiuba Ruiz, 2013 – Brazil
Soesilarishius ruizi Zhang & Maddison, 2012 – Brazil, French Guiana
Soesilarishius spinipes Ruiz, 2011 – Brazil
Soesilarishius tabernarius Ruiz, 2013 – Brazil
Soesilarishius trombetas Ruiz & Sobrinho, 2016 – Brazil

See also
 Rishaschia
 Soesiladeepakius

References

Salticidae
Salticidae genera
Spiders of South America